The Pharos Lighthouse (also known as the Upper Lighthouse)  is a  tall Runcorn red sandstone lighthouse situated in Fleetwood, Lancashire, England.  The lighthouse was designed in 1839 by Decimus Burton and Capt H.M. Denham.  Burton has been commissioned three years previously by Sir Peter Hesketh Fleetwood as the architect of the new town of Fleetwood.  Construction was completed in 1840.  Unusually for a functioning British lighthouse, it stands in the middle of a residential street (Pharos Street).  Though officially named the 'Upper Lighthouse', it has been known as the 'Pharos' since its construction, after the celebrated ancient lighthouse Pharos of Alexandria.

The lighthouse was designed and constructed in conjunction with the much shorter Lower Lighthouse (also known as Beach Lighthouse) which stands on Fleetwood sea front. The lighthouses are designed to be used as a pair to guide shipping through the treacherous sandbanks of the Wyre estuary. The light from the Pharos should be kept immediately above the light from the Lower for safe passage down the channel. Both lighthouses were first illuminated on 1 December 1840. Each was run off the town's gas supply, with a single parabolic reflector placed behind the burner; later they were converted to electricity.

For many years, the lighthouse was painted a striking cream and red colour, but in the late 1970s, the original sandstone was again exposed. The Fleetwood terminal loop of the Blackpool tramway runs past the foot of the lighthouse.  The lighthouse is managed by the Port of Fleetwood.  The interior is closed to the general public.

See also

 List of lighthouses in England
Listed buildings in Fleetwood

References
Footnotes

Bibliography

External links

Lighthouses completed in 1840
Ancient Alexandria in art and culture
Buildings and structures in Fleetwood
Grade II listed buildings in Lancashire
Grade II listed lighthouses
Lighthouses in England
Tourist attractions in the Borough of Wyre
Decimus Burton buildings